The Battle of the Saintes (known to the French as the Bataille de la Dominique), also known as the Battle of Dominica, was an important naval battle in the Caribbean between the British and the French that took place 9–12 April 1782. The British victory was considered their greatest over the French during the American Revolutionary War.

The British fleet under Admiral Sir George Rodney defeated a French fleet under the Comte de Grasse, forcing the French and Spanish to abandon a planned invasion of Jamaica.

The battle is named after the Îles des Saintes, a group of small islands between Guadeloupe and Dominica in the West Indies. The French had blockaded the British Army at Chesapeake Bay the year before, during the Siege of Yorktown, and supported the eventual American victory in their revolution. This battle, however, halted their momentum and had a significant effect on peace negotiations to end the war.

The French suffered heavy casualties at the Saintes and many were taken prisoner, including de Grasse. Four French ships of the line were captured (including the flagship) and one was destroyed. Rodney was credited with pioneering the tactic of "breaking the line" in the battle, though this is disputed.

Background
In October 1781 Admiral Comte de Grasse, commander of the French fleet in the West Indies; Francisco Saavedra de Sangronis, General Bureau for the Spanish Indies; and Bernardo de Gálvez, court representative and aide to the Spanish Governor of Louisiana, developed a plan against British forces. The strategic objectives of the Franco-Spanish military forces in the West Indies in this plan were:
 to aid the Americans and defeat the British naval squadron at New York
 to capture the British Windward Islands and
 to conquer Jamaica.

This plan became known as the "De Grasse–Saavedra Convention." The first objective had been essentially met by the surrender of the British army under General Cornwallis at the Siege of Yorktown in September 1781. De Grasse and his fleet had played a decisive part in that victory, after which they returned to the Caribbean. On arrival in Saint-Domingue in November 1781, the admiral was notified to proceed with a plan for the conquest of Jamaica.

Jamaica was the largest and most profitable British island in the Caribbean, mainly because of sugar: it was more valuable to the British economy than all of the 13 American colonies. King George III wrote to Lord Sandwich, saying that he would protect Britain's important Caribbean islands at the risk of Britain herself, and this was the strategy implemented in 1779. Sugar made up 20% of all British imports and was worth five times as much as tobacco. The French and Spanish were fighting to take over Jamaica in order to expel the British from the West Indies, and to strike a massive blow against the British economy. The courts at Paris and Madrid perceived the invasion of Jamaica as an alternative to the Spanish and French attempts to take Gibraltar, which for two years had been a costly disaster.

Whilst de Grasse waited for reinforcements to undertake the Jamaica campaign, he captured St. Kitts in February 1782. The rest of the Windward Islands—Antigua, St. Lucia, and Barbados—still remained under British control. Admiral George Rodney arrived in the Caribbean theatre the following month, bringing reinforcements. These included 17 ships of the line and gave the British a slight numerical advantage.

On 7 April 1782, de Grasse set out from Martinique with 35 ships of the line, including two 50-gun ships and a large convoy of more than 100 cargo ships, to meet with a Spanish fleet of 12 ships of the line. In addition de Grasse was to rendezvous with 15,000 troops at Saint Domingue, who were earmarked for the conquest and intended to land on Jamaica's north coast. Rodney, on learning of this, sailed from St. Lucia in pursuit with 36 ships of the line the following day.

The British ships' hulls by this time had been given copper sheathing to protect them from marine growth, fouling, and saltwater corrosion, dramatically improving speed and overall sailing performance in good wind.

Opposing fleets and officers

The British flagship was HMS Formidable under Admiral Rodney. Second in command was Admiral Samuel Hood. and third was Vice Admiral Francis Samuel Drake. As was the convention of the day, the fleet was split into three sections: Rodney had individual control as Admiral of the White of 12 ships flying the White Ensign; Drake had command of 12 ships as Admiral of the Blue flying the Blue Ensign; and Hood was Admiral of the Red with 12 ships flying the Red Ensign.

Formidable was accompanied by three 98-gun ships: HMS Barfleur (commanded by Hood), HMS Prince George, and HMS Duke, plus the 90-gun HMS Namur. The remaining 31 ships were equipped with 64 to 74 guns. In total the British fleet had 2,620 guns compared to the French total of 2,526. Most of the British fleet was equipped with carronades on the upper decks, which had a major advantage in flexibility and were a great advantage at close quarters.

In March 1782 Formidable was stationed at Gros Islet Bay between the island of St. Lucia and Pigeon Island. She was under the command of Admiral Rodney, serving as his flagship at the head of 36 ships of the line. Meanwhile, French Admiral de Grasse headed 34 ships of the line at Fort Royal Bay in Martinique. Rodney had been dispatched from Britain with 12 well-fitted ships to rescue the West Indies from a series of attacks from the French, which had already resulted in the loss of several islands. They joined 24 ships on St. Lucia who had already seen action against the French and were undergoing repairs.

The French had allies in the Spanish, who had 13 ships of the line at Cap‑Français on the island of San Domingo (Hispaniola). Together with transport ships, the Spanish had a considerable force of 24,000 men. They awaited the arrival of a further 10,000 French troops dispatched from Brest, under escort of five men-of-war, to further boost their strength. The plan was for Grasse's fleet, with at least 5,000 further troops, to unite with the Spanish at Cap‑Français, and from there to attack and capture the island of Jamaica with their conjoined armada of some 60 ships and 40,000 troops.

Rodney had been in communication with de Grasse during March, organising the exchange of prisoners, who were conveyed by HMS Alert under Captain Vashon. The two officers had much mutual respect. Rodney's task was to intercept the French fleet en route to Cap‑Français.

Grasse's vice admiral at the time was Louis-Philippe de Rigaud, Marquis de Vaudreuil. Third in command was Louis Antoine de Bougainville. The French flagship was the huge 104-gun Ville de Paris. The troops were under the command of the Marquis de Bouillé. The French fleet was also split into three squadrons: Grasse led the "Cornette Blanche;" Bougainville led the "Escadre Bleue;" and Vaudreuil as a second-in-command flew the mixed white and blue colours of the "Blanche et Bleue."

Other British commanders included Captain Lord Robert Manners of HMS Resolution, Admiral William Cornwallis in command of HMS Canada, and HMS Monarch under the command of Captain Francis Reynolds. Other aristocrats present included Captain Lord Cranstoun, a supernumerary onboard Formidable. Sir Charles Douglas, a nephew of Charles Douglas, 3rd Duke of Queensberry, was Captain of the Fleet. Sir James Wallace was also present. Other commanders included Captains Blair, Buckner, Burnett, Charrington, Cornish, Dumaresq, Graves, Inglefield, Inglis, Knight, Parry, Saumarez, Savage, Symons, Truscott, Wilkinson, Williams, and Wilson. Frederick Thesiger, Acting Lieutenant on board Formidable, was appointed as Rodney’s aide-de-camp shortly before the battle.

A lookout squadron, a line of frigates headed by Captain George Anson Byron on HMS Andromache, reported all of de Grasse's movements at Fort Royal. This squadron included the speedy HMS Agamemnon and also HMS Magnificent.

Pre-battle movements

On 3 April it was signalled that the repairs on the French fleet were complete. On 5 April it was reported that the French troops were boarding the ships. At 8:00 am on Sunday 8 April, it was reported that the French fleet were leaving Fort Royal. Rodney's fleet called all men to join their ships and they began leaving Gros Islet Bay at 10:30 am.

The total French armada comprised 35 ships of the line, 10 frigates, and over 100 smaller ships. The smaller ships moved in advance of the men-of-war, heading for St. Pierre.

Just past 4:00 pm Hood's Barfleur, at the head of the British fleet, espied five sails ahead that she presumed to be part of the French fleet. These came into view of Formidable around two hours later, just before sunset. They pursued the French through the night. At 2:00 am on 9 April, HMS St Albans dropped alongside Formidable, reporting that along with HMS Valiant, she had located the French fleet in the darkness. Rodney rested for the remainder of the night.

The sun rose at 5:30 am. The French fleet extended from six to 12 miles distant, navigating the waters between Dominica and Guadeloupe. The majority of the warships lay off Prince Rupert's Bay.

Due to a dead calm from 3:00 until 7:00 am, neither fleet could move. The initial wind only reached Barfleur and its eight support ships, causing them to detach ahead of the main fleet, which lay in the lee of Dominica. De Grasse saw the opportunity to cripple this advanced section and wheeled to begin the first attack.

Battle 
On 9 April 1782 the copper-sheathed British fleet caught up with the French, who were surprised by their speed. Admiral de Grasse ordered the French convoy to head into Guadeloupe for repair, forcing him to escort two 50-gun ships (Fier and Experiment), and placing his fleet in line of battle in order to cover the retreat.

First encounters

Hood's section of the fleet, headed by Barfleur, braced for the first attack. As the first action, HMS Alfred taunted the 18 approaching French ships under de Vaudreuil by exposing her broadside to the approaching French, but without consequence. The British patiently awaited the formal signal from Rodney on Formidable, some six miles behind, and eventually received a red flag signal telling them to "engage the enemy." As the wind rose around noon, it enabled most of the French fleet and part of the British fleet (including Rodney in Formidable) to join the melee. At this point the French outnumbered the British two to one. Captain William Bayne on Alfred was killed during this action.

After an inconclusive encounter during which both sides suffered damage, de Grasse realised that the remainder of the British fleet would soon be upon them and broke off the engagement to withdraw a safe distance. De Grasse moved his ships to the Saintes Islands to the north (south of Guadeloupe). Meanwhile, Rodney reversed the order of his line to bring Drake's hitherto undamaged ships to the front, and allow Hood to undertake repairs in the rear lines.

On 10 April the French began 10 miles distant but did not turn to engage, instead continuing on their original course, and by nightfall had increased their separation to 15 miles. This appears to be partly due to the incorrect presumption on Rodney's part that the French were going to turn to engage.

On Wednesday 11 April two French ships,  and Magnanime, who had accidentally collided and fallen behind the main French fleet, came into view around noon. Rodney decided that attacking these two ships would cause de Grasse to return to protect them, which worked: a large section of the French fleet turned to protect the pair. These movements were executed without any physical attacks.

Main engagement
On 12 April the French were ranged from six to 12 miles distant and were not in formation, as the two fleets manoeuvred between the northern end of Dominica and the Saintes in the Saintes Passage. The unfortunate Zélé had had a second collision during the night with one of its rescuers, Ville de Paris, and was now being towed to Basse-Terre in Guadeloupe by Astrée with General de Bouillé on board. They were chased by four British ships: Monarch, Valiant, HMS Centaur and HMS Belliqueux. De Grasse made for Guadeloupe and bore up with his fleet to protect the ship. At the same time, Rodney recalled his chasing ships and made the signal for line of battle.

Rear Admiral Hood's van division were still making repairs from the action three days earlier, so he directed his rear division, under Rear Admiral Drake, to take the lead. At 7:40,  under Captain Taylor Penny led the British line and opened battle when she approached the centre of the French line. Having remained parallel with the French, the ships of Drake's division passed the remaining length of de Grasse's line and the two sides exchanged broadsides, a typical naval engagement of the time.

Initial attack 

Marlborough headed the British attack. As the battle progressed, the strong winds of the previous day and night began to temper and became more variable.

At 8:00 am Formidable raised the red flag to permit Marlborough to open fire and engage the French. At this point Marlborough was opposite Dauphin Royal, who received her full broadside. Sixteen ships in line separated Marlborough from Formidable and each stood 200 metres apart. As each circled past the French, they fired a broadside against them. Second, behind Marlborough, was HMS Arrogant, who had been recently re-equipped and managed three broadsides against one from the French as they passed. Third in line was HMS Alcide under Captain Charles Thomson. Then followed HMS Nonsuch under Captain Truscott, and then HMS Conqueror under Captain George Balfour.

Next in line was Admiral Drake on HMS Princessa, who was in command of the first 12 vessels, and was followed by Prince George under Captain Williams. Then came the 100-year-old HMS Torbay under Captain Keppel and the year-old HMS Anson under Captain William Blair on the main deck, who was struck by round shot at waist level and sliced in two. The blue squadron was then completed by HMS Fame and HMS Russell under Captain James Saumarez.

The white squadron under Rodney followed in exact formation after the blue. This was headed by HMS America under Captain Thompson. HMS Hercules under Captain Henry Savage followed. Then came HMS Prothee under Captain Buckner and Resolution under Captain Robert Manners. The 24-year-old Manners was the first casualty on his ship and was severely injured in both legs and right arm, dying later of these wounds. Resolution was followed by Duke under Captain Alan Gardner.

As Formidable was in the centre of the British line, it took her almost an hour to reach the centre of the action. All ships had to maintain a steady speed, and as she passed de Grasse's flagship, the 104-gun Ville de Paris, the two met for the first time. Ville de Paris was already damaged by the 15 ships ahead of Formidable in the line. Although it was a sunny day, the smoke of the battle was like a dense fog. Formidable entered the smoke and approached Ville de Paris at 8:40 am.

The countermovement of the fleets brought a series of ships opposite Formidable in sequence behind Ville de Paris, movements that brought about a different pairing of enemies every five minutes. Next was Couronne, followed by Éveillé under Le Gardeur de Tilly, and then Sceptre under the command of de Vaudreuil.

Breaking the line

Within an hour, the wind had shifted to the south, forcing the French line to separate and bear to the west, as it could not hold its course into the wind. This allowed the British to use guns on both sides of their ships without fear of return fire from the front and rear of the French ships, between which they were passing. The effect was greater using the carronades, with which the British had just equipped nearly half their fleet. This relatively new short-range weapon was quicker to reload and more of them could be carried. , under command of Captain des Cars, moving in the wake of Ville de Paris, was the next victim. Virtually a sitting duck due to damage in the previous 10 minutes from Duke, she was quickly pounded and dismasted by intense fire.

In the confusion four French ships beginning with Diadem broke out of sequence, partly due to the uncontrollable speed of the mastless Glorieux. Formidable turned to starboard and brought her port guns to bear on them. As a result Formidable sailed through the gap, breaking the French line. This breach was further followed through by five other British ships. The breach was later recorded by Charles Dashwood, who was a midshipman on Formidable on that day.

Although the concept of "breaking the line" was born here, it is logically of mixed blessings, since in breaking the enemy line, one breaks one's own line. Whilst the movement has the advantage that guns can be fired on both port and starboard sides, it also exposes the ship to attack on both sides. The advantage in this instance was that many of the French gunners left their post, in fear of Formidable'''s three tiers of guns bearing down on them.Diadem appears to have fully withdrawn from the battle at this stage, and many presumed her to be sunk. Formidable was followed by Namur under Captain Fanshawe and then St Albans under Captain Inglis. These were followed by the deadly Canada under Captain William Cornwallis, HMS Repulse under Captain Thomas Dumaresq, and HMS Ajax under Captain Nicholas Charrington. Each of these fired further upon the hapless and already crippled Glorieux.

Simultaneously, and because of the smoke, Commodore Edmund Affleck on Bedford, the hindmost ship of the central white squadron, accidentally sailed through the confused French line, between César and Hector, only to discover this error when no enemy lay on his starboard side in the clearing smoke.Bedford was followed by Hood's red squadron and this broke the French line into three sections. In the confusion the two leading ships of the rear red squadron, HMS Prince William and Magnificent, had somehow passed Bedford, who was now third in line within the red squadron and completely detached from her own white squadron. The whole red squadron then passed between César and Hector, causing each to be crippled. The final ship of the red squadron, HMS Royal Oak, passed the stern of César and delivered a final blow a few minutes after 11:00 am. Both fleets then drifted apart for some time and became temporarily becalmed.

Around noon, both fleets observed that the waters were teeming with sharks attracted by the noise and blood. French casualties were greatly increased due to the high number of troops packed onto the lower decks: a minimum of 900 per ship and no fewer than 1,300 on Ville de Paris. In order to lessen the confusion, the French had been throwing the dead (and perhaps the near-dead) overboard, a rich feast for the sharks.

French retreat
The French now lay totally to the leeward of the British fleet, which stood between them and their destination. They had little option on the re-emergence of the wind but to sail west with it and attempt escape. At 1:00 pm the frigate Richemont, under the command of Captain De Mortemart, but with Denis Decrès in charge of the marines, was sent to join a towing cable to the heavily crippled Glorieux. Souverain moved alongside to provide covering fire. However, the British, with both wind and cannon-power in their favour, moved a number of ships up to block this movement.

The captain of Glorieux was already dead, and the ship was now under command of the senior officer remaining, Lieutenant Trogoff de Kerlessi. Souverain and Richmond retreated under heavy fire, and Kerlessi had little choice but to tear the flag from the mast and surrender, which was done to Royal Oak. Captain Burnett used this opportunity to restock his depleted powder supplies. Meanwhile, Monarch stood alongside Andromache, who was acting as a supply ship to the British fleet; 40 barrels of powder were exchanged.

In the next action, around 1:30 pm, Centaur and Bedford attacked the stricken César, captained by Bernard de Marigny, who refused to surrender and was seriously wounded in the first five minutes. Command then fell to his Captain Paul.

With their formation shattered and many of their ships severely damaged, the French fell away to the southwest in small groups. Rodney attempted to redeploy and make repairs before pursuing the French. By 2:00 pm the wind had freshened and a general chase ensued. As the British pressed south, Ardent. After taking possession of Glorieux, they caught up with the French rear at around 3:00 pm. Admiral de Grasse signalled other ships to protect Ville de Paris, but this was only partially fulfilled. Nine ships from de Vaudreuil's squadron came to his aid.

The British fleet bore down on this small group. In succession Rodney's ships isolated the other three ships. César, which was soon totally dismasted and in flames, was captured by Centaur. Soon after 5:00 pm, Hector, having been flanked by Canada and Alcide, soon became a completely dismasted wreck. Following the mortal wounding of his captain, De la Vicomte, his first lieutenant De Beaumanoir, lowered the ship's flag and surrendered to Alcide.

Bougainville, who commanded , had ordered eight ships of his own division to aid Ville de Paris, but only Ardent had proceeded. Her isolation caused her to be flanked by Belliqueux and Prince William, soon leading to her capture.

At 5:30 pm de Grasse's Ville de Paris stood practically alone and had Barfleur in close pursuit, with Formidable close behind. Five ships from de Vaudreuil's squadron were trying to protect her, but none in close formation. These were Triomphant (de Vaudreuil's flagship), Bourgogne (under De La Charette), Magnifique (Macarty Macteigue), Pluton (De Rions), and Marseillais (De Castellane-Majastre). Three ships from de Grasse's squadron also still remained: Languedoc, Couronne and Sceptre.

De Grasse's closest protector, Couronne, moved away at the approach of Canada, who began the final attack on Ville de Paris. With little support and suffering huge losses in men, de Grasse made another attempt to signal the fleet and gave the order "to build the line on the starboard tack," but again this was not done. By this time, most of the French fleet, apart from those ships that were surrounded, had retreated.

End of the battleCanada swept past Ville de Paris, doing damage to the spars and slowing her further. HMS Russell under Captain Saumarez then moved diagonally along the stern of the flagship and fired a broadside that ripped the entire length of the ship. Russell then moved to the leeward side to hamper the ship's retreat, whilst Barfleur moved onto the opposite side. Languedoc attempted to approach and give aid but was beaten back by Duke.Ville de Paris was in desperate condition, with all masts damaged, the rudder shot away, and at least 300 men dead or injured in the cockpit. Around 6:00 pm, overwhelmed and suffering terrible losses, Ville de Paris eventually struck her colours, signaling surrender. Hood approached on Barfleur, which de Grasse had indicated was his preferred method of surrender. In an ungentlemanly act, Hood ordered one final broadside at close quarters, when de Grasse had already indicated surrender.

The boarding crew, which included the British fleet surgeon Gilbert Blane, were horrified at the carnage. Admiral de Grasse appeared not to have a scratch on him, whilst every one of his officers had either been killed or wounded; only three men were unwounded. Rodney boarded soon after, and Hood presented de Grasse to him. With his surrender, the battle had effectively ended, except for a few long-range desultory shots and the retreat of many of the French ships in disorder. The gallantry of William Cornwallis of Canada (younger brother of Charles Cornwallis) gained the admiration of the whole fleet. One officer noted that he was "like Hector, as if emulous to revenge his brothers cause."

The Marquis de Vaudreuil, seeing de Grasse's fate through his telescope, took command of the remaining scattered French naval fleet. On 13 April he had 10 ships with him and sailed toward Cap-Français. Rodney signaled his fleet not to pursue the remaining ships. The battle was thus over.

Later that night around 9:00 pm, fire broke out on César, begun by the entrapped French crew on the lower decks, who had broken into the liquor stores. By 10:30 pm the fire was out of control and the magazine exploded, killing more than 400 French and 58 British sailors, plus the lieutenant in charge, all from Centaur. Many men jumped overboard trying to avoid the conflagration, only to fall victim to the sharks below. Captain Marigny, who had been confined to his cabin, was one of the many killed, and none of the British prize crew survived.

Casualties
The British lost 243 killed and 816 wounded, and two captains out of 36 were killed, whilst no ships were lost. The highest casualties were on Duke, with 73 killed or wounded, including the death of Lieutenant Rowland de Cerjat. The total French casualties have never been stated, but six captains out of 30 were killed. In terms of soldiers and sailors, estimates range from 3,000 killed or wounded and 5,000 captured, to as many as around 3,000 dead, 6,000 wounded, and 6,000 captured. In addition to several French ships captured, others were severely damaged. The high number of casualties demonstrates the considerable force the French committed to achieve the invasion of Jamaica. Of Ville de Pariss crew alone, over 400 were killed and more than 700 were wounded—more than the casualties of the entire British fleet. De Grasse—the first French admiral in history to be captured by an enemy—was sent to England, where he was paroled.

Aftermath

Rodney's failure to follow up the victory by a pursuit was criticised. Samuel Hood said that the 20 French ships would have been captured had Rodney maintained the chase. In 1899 the Navy Records Society published the Dispatches and Letters Relating to the Blockading of Brest. In the introduction, they include a small biography of William Cornwallis. A poem purportedly written by him includes the lines:

On 17 April Hood was sent in pursuit of the French, and promptly captured two 64-gun ships of the line (Jason and ) and two smaller warships in the Battle of the Mona Passage on 19 April. Following this victory, Hood rendezvoused with Rodney at Port Royal on 29 April. As a result of the damage the fleet had sustained in battle, repairs took nine weeks.

Soon after the defeat, the French fleet reached Cap-François in several waves. The main contingent, under de Vaudreuil, arrived on 25 April. Marseillais, along with Hercule,  and Éveillé, arrived on 11 May. In May all 26 French ships from the battle arrived from Martinique and were soon joined by 12 Spanish ships. Disease struck the French forces, in particular the soldiers, of whom thousands died. The allies' hesitation and indecision soon led them to abandon plans to attack Jamaica. Instead the French and Spanish focused on protecting their own territories. Jamaica remained a British colony, as indeed did Barbados and Antigua.

Disaster struck the British months after the battle when Admiral Graves was leading a fleet back to England that included the French prizes from the battle. The fleet encountered the 1782 Central Atlantic hurricane in September, which hit off Newfoundland. Glorieux, Hector and Ville de Paris, along with other ships, foundered or sank with heavy loss of life.

Reactions
News of the battle reached France in June and was met with despair. The defeat along with the loss of Ville de Paris was a devastating blow to French king Louis XVI. The navy minister, the Marquis de Castries, greeted the news as "a grim disaster." The Comte de Vergennes felt undermined in the confidence of the French navy. All blame lay on the Comte de Grasse, whilst he himself sought long to clear his name. He blamed his subordinates de Vaudreuil and Bougainville for the defeat, but an infuriated Louis bluntly told de Grasse to retire.

The battle had repercussions for France's finances: the monetary loss was huge. On  Ville de Paris alone, 36 chests of money worth at least £500,000 were found, this being payment for the troops. During the first four years of the war, the French navy had lost four ships of the line (three of them to accidents), whereas during 1782 it would lose 15 ships of the line, nearly half of these in April alone. The losses of these ships were significant. Nevertheless, Louis promised to build more ships after new taxes were levied. The French finance minister, Jean-François Joly de Fleury, successfully secured the addition of a Vingtième income tax, the third and last one of its kind in the ancien regime.

There was widespread celebration in Britain upon news of the victory. In the newspaper Cumberland Pacquet it was noted, "A joy unknown for years past seemed to spread itself amongst all ranks of people." On his return Rodney was feted as a hero, and a number of cartoons and caricatures were created to commemorate the victory. He presented the Comte de Grasse personally to King George III as a prisoner, and was created a peer with £2,000 a year settled on the title in perpetuity. A number of paintings were commissioned to celebrate his victory, notably by Thomas Gainsborough and Joshua Reynolds. Hood was also elevated to the peerage, whilst Drake and Affleck were made baronets.

Impact on peace negotiations

Following the Franco-American victory at Yorktown six months earlier and the change of Government in England, peace negotiations in Paris had begun among Britain, the American colonies, France, and Spain in early 1782. The battle had a significant effect on those talks when news arrived of its outcome in June. The result of the Battle of the Saintes transferred the strategic initiative to the British, whose dominance at sea was reasserted. News of the defeat reached the Americans, who soon realised they were unlikely to have much French support in the future. American General Nathanael Greene had high hopes of French assistance in the recapture of Charleston, but the defeat led to its abandonment.

No longer humbled, the British stiffened their resolve: they objected to American claims on the Newfoundland fisheries and Canada. As a result the American negotiators led by John Jay became more amenable. Not only did they drop their minimum demands and insist on the single precondition of recognition of their independence, they also put forward America's abandonment of its commitment to make no separate peace treaty without the French. The victory at the Saintes thus signaled a collapse in the Franco-American alliance. Despite this the battle did not affect the overall outcome of the American Revolution.

De Castries urged Spain to join the French to send another armada against the British West Indies. On the theory of this victory, it would win bargaining power to force Britain's acceptance of American independence. Vergennes, however, was desperate for peace, and time was running out: France was approaching the limits of its ability to borrow money. France had also promised not to make peace with England until Spain had achieved its principal goal of conquering Gibraltar. By October this attempt had been defeated: a huge Spanish attempt in September was repelled with heavy losses, following which Richard Howe, with a large naval convoy, then relieved the garrison. As a result Vergennes demanded that Spain give up its claim on Gibraltar to make peace, to which the latter acquiesced.

The Comte de Grasse, who was a high-profile prisoner in Britain, was used to exchange messages of peace between Great Britain and France. A preliminary peace treaty between Great Britain and the United States was signed on 30 November 1782. Thus, with the Americans split from their allies, peace was signed with France and Spain in January 1783. Initial articles of peace were signed in July, following by a full treaty in September 1783. Owing to their military successes in 1782, the peace treaties that brought the war to an end were less disadvantageous for Britain than had been anticipated.

Impact on naval tactics
Superior British seamanship and gunnery ruled the day in what is considered the greatest naval victory for the British over the French during the American Revolutionary War.

The battle is famous for the innovative British tactic of "breaking the line," in which the British ships passed through a gap in the French line, engaging the enemy from leeward and throwing them into disorder. Arguably the battle was not the first time a line had been broken: Dano–Norwegian admiral Niels Juel had done this in the Battle of Køge Bay more than one hundred years earlier; and even earlier the Dutch admiral Michiel de Ruyter had used it for the first time in the last day of the Four Days' Battle in 1666 (and again in the Battle of Schooneveld and the Battle of Texel of 1673). Historians disagree about whether the tactic was intentional or made possible by weather. If intentional, who should receive credit is ambiguous: Rodney, his Scottish Captain-of-the-Fleet and aide-de-camp, Sir Charles Douglas, or John Clerk of Eldin.

As a result of the battle, British naval tactics changed. The old method had involved the attacking fleet spreading itself along the entire enemy line. In the five formal fleet actions involving the Royal Navy between the Battle of the Saintes and the Battle of Trafalgar, all were victories for the British and achieved by the creation of localised numerical superiority.

Monuments
A huge ornate monument to the three captains lost in the battle—William Blair, William Bayne and Robert Manners—was erected to their memory in Westminster Abbey. The 25 feet high marble monument by Joseph Nollekens was completed in 1793. It consists of a figure of Fame standing on a column which has relief portraits of the captains attached, above figures of Britannia and a lion opposite figures of Neptune and a sea horse.

A monument in Spanish Town, Jamaica, was created to honour Admiral Rodney's role in the battle. It was created by the sculptor John Bacon in 1801. Two of the Ville de Paris guns flank Rodney's statue.

 Order of battle 

 Britain 

 France 

Not in line: Frigates Richemont (Mortemart); Amazone (Ensign Bourgarel de Martignan, acting captain replacing Montguyot); Aimable (Lieutenant de Suzannet); Galathée (Lieutenant de Roquart); corvette Cérès (Lieutenant de Paroy); and cutter Clairvoyant (Ensign de Daché); cutter Pandour (Grasse-Limermont).

In popular culture
The battle is the subject of the title track on No Grave But the Sea, the 2017 album by the Scottish "pirate metal" band Alestorm. The lyrics mention de Grasse, the British ships Duke and Bedford, and the tactic of "breaking the line."

The battle was the climax of the first written Richard Bolitho novel by Alexander Kent.

The battle is featured in Le Dernier Panache, a show in the Puy du Fou, wherein the show's main character, François de Charette, fights in the Battle of the Saintes. In the show and in reality he fought the battle as a lieutenant de vaisseau.

In the verse epic Omeros by Nobel-prize-winning poet Derek Walcott, which is set largely on St. Lucia, the retired British officer Major Plunkett is researching the battle. Two chapters tell the story of his namesake Midshipman Plunkett, who dies in the battle.

 References 

Footnotes

Citations

Bibliography
 
 
 
 
 
 
 
 
 
 
 
 
 
 
 
 
 
 
 
 
 
 
 
 
 
 
 
 Playfair, John (1822). "On the Naval Tactics of the Late John Clerk, Esq. of Eldin." The Works of John Playfair'', Vol. III

Further reading

External links
 
 

Naval battles of the Anglo-French War (1778–1783)
Naval battles of the American Revolutionary War
Naval battles of the American Revolutionary War involving France
Naval battles involving France
Naval battles involving Great Britain
History of British Dominica
Wars involving Dominica
Conflicts in 1782
1782 in the Caribbean
History of Îles des Saintes
American Revolutionary War orders of battle